Upper Ohio  is a community of the Municipality of the District of Shelburne in the Canadian province of Nova Scotia.  Upper Ohio is one community in Nova scotia that is still not on the power grid.

References

Upper Ohio on Destination Nova Scotia

Communities in Shelburne County, Nova Scotia
General Service Areas in Nova Scotia